Harclay is a surname. Notable people with the surname include:

 Andrew Harclay, 1st Earl of Carlisle ( 1270–1323), English military leader
 Henry Harclay ( 1270–1317), English medieval philosopher and university chancellor

See also
 Harlay